The 2022 Liga 3 Special Region of Yogyakarta will be the fifth season of Liga 3 Special Region of Yogyakarta as a qualifying round for the national round of the 2022–23 Liga 3.

Mataram Utama were the defending champion. They were promoted to the 2022-23 Liga 2 following the conclusion of last season's national round, however they relinquished their Liga 2 spot to Nusantara United.

Teams
There are 18 teams participated in the league this season.

First round

Group A

Group B

Group C

Second round 
Wait for the first round to finish.

References 

Liga 3 (Indonesia) seasons
Special Region of Yogyakarta
Football in Indonesia